Ab Gonjeshki (also Romanized as Āb Gonjeshkī; also known as Āb Gonjeshgān and Āb Gonjeshkān) is a village in Donbaleh Rud-e Shomali Rural District, Dehdez District, Izeh County, Khuzestan Province, Iran. At the 2006 census, its population was 37, in 6 families.

References 

Populated places in Izeh County